Tredwell Scudder (January 1, 1778 – October 31, 1834) was a U.S. Representative from New York.

Career
Town supervisor of Islip in 1795, 1796, and 1804–1815. He served as member of the State assembly in 1802, 1810, 1811, 1814, and 1815. Scudder was elected as a Democratic-Republican to the Fifteenth Congress (March 4, 1817 – March 3, 1819). He was not a candidate for renomination in 1818. He resumed agricultural pursuits. He again served in the State assembly in 1822 and 1828. Her returned as town supervisor of Islip from 1824 to 1833. He died in Islip, New York, October 31, 1834. He was interred in that village.

Sources

1778 births
1834 deaths
People from Islip (town), New York
Democratic-Republican Party members of the United States House of Representatives from New York (state)